Solo Piano may refer to:

Solo Piano (Jaki Byard album), 1969
Solo Piano (Toshiko Akiyoshi album), 1971
Solo Piano (Tommy Flanagan album), 1974
Solo Piano (Phineas Newborn, Jr. album), 1975
Solo Piano Album, a 1975 recording by jazz pianist Don Pullen
Solo Piano (Philip Glass album), 1989
Solo Piano, a 2004 album by Gonzales
Miscellaneous solo piano compositions (Rachmaninoff)

See also
Piano solo, a musical composition written solely for piano
Piano Solo, code name for an envisaged plot for an Italian coup in 1964